The canton of Gorron is an administrative division of the Mayenne department, northwestern France. Its borders were modified at the French canton reorganisation which came into effect in March 2015. Its seat is in Gorron.

It consists of the following communes:
 
Ambrières-les-Vallées
Brecé
Carelles
Chantrigné
Châtillon-sur-Colmont
Colombiers-du-Plessis
Couesmes-Vaucé
Désertines
La Dorée
Fougerolles-du-Plessis
Gorron
Hercé
Landivy
Lesbois
Levaré
Montaudin
Oisseau
Le Pas
Pontmain
Saint-Aubin-Fosse-Louvain
Saint-Berthevin-la-Tannière
Saint-Ellier-du-Maine
Saint-Loup-du-Gast
Saint-Mars-sur-Colmont
Saint-Mars-sur-la-Futaie
Soucé
Vieuvy

References

Cantons of Mayenne